Alastair Nisbet (born 1958) is a Scottish-born New Zealand cartoonist.

Career 
Nisbet's cartoons were published in the Christchurch Press from 1980-2017. He has worked for a number of other newspapers including the Sunday Times, New Zealand Times, Stuff, and the Independent. He has twice been named the New Zealand cartoonist of the year.

Criticism 
Nisbet's cartoons have "often attracted complaints for their racist, sexist, and classist nature". In 2013 two of his cartoons were taken to the Press Council for promoting "racial disharmony". A complaint about the cartoons was also lodged with the Human Rights Commission in 2014 by Member of Parliament Louisa Wall, but the complaint was dismissed.

External links 
 Search for work relating to Al Nisbet on DigitalNZ.

References 

1958 births
Living people
Scottish emigrants to New Zealand
New Zealand cartoonists
New Zealand satirists